The  (Royal Artillery Regiment) is the artillery corps of the Malaysian Army.  was formed in Kajang on 15 August 1957 when a single battery was formed, drawn from Malay personnel formerly serving with the British Army's Royal Regiment of Artillery. Today  is a modern fighting arm providing direct fire support to Malaysian Army units using field artillery pieces and MLRS.

History
In 1957, an officer from Malaya Command was sent to Singapore to invite Malayan citizens serving with the 1st Singapore Artillery regiment to return home and serve with the Federation Artillery Battery. The drive succeeded in recruiting 89 personnel of 1 Singapore Artillery to return and serve with the Federation Army.

On 15 August 1957, the 1st Field Battery, Federation Army was formed in Kajang  with 89 gunners of all ranks, all veterans of the Royal Artillery in Singapore, this date is today marked as its regimental anniversary. The founding battery was equipped with the British 25 pounder field gun and was  commanded by Major Sherston Baker, Royal Artillery. Its guns fired the 21 gun salute on Hari Merdeka around half a month later. His successor was Major Rowe and on 1 January 1962 the 1st Regiment Federation Artillery was formed under Lt Col W E Black, its first commander.

Colonel In Chief And Regimental Motto 
He is also the Commander-in-Chief of the Malaysian Armed Forces when he assumed office aa the 15th Yang Di-Pertuan Agong on 13 December 2016.

The regimental Motto is "".

Role
The modern  is equipped with a variety of equipment and fulfils a wide range of roles, including observation, Airborne Artillery, Armoured (Mechanised) Artillery, Long Range Missile Systems and Air defence.

Equipment

The regiment is equipped with Field Artillery pieces, Multiple Launched Rocket Launchers, Anti Aircraft Artillery and Air Defence Missiles. Presently the artillery inventory includes:

 Astros II MLRS
 G5 howitzer
 FH-70 
 OTO Melara Mod 56 
 M102 howitzer
 GIAT LG1
 Rapier (missile)
 Oerlikon 35 mm twin cannon (GDF-005 variant) and 15 FCU Skyguard Radar Systems
 Bofors 40 mm (L70 variant)

Field Artillery Regiments
Field Artillery Regiments are equipped with 105mm Pack Howitzers which have a range of 10,500 metres.

Air Defence Artillery Regiments

Air Defence Artillery Regiments are equipped with either:
 Radar guided anti-aircraft artillery such as the Oerlikon 35 mm gun system
 Man portable Surface to Air missiles such as the Thales Starstreak, the Anza MK II and the Igla missile systems, with an effective slant range of 5,000 metres.
 The BAe Jernas missile with a reported slant radius of 8,000 metres.

Planned Purchase of Medium Range SAM
AFP reported on 20 July 2004 from Kuala Lumpur quoting Deputy Prime Minister Najib Razak that Malaysia has agreed in principle to purchase medium-range KS-1A missiles from China.

Units 
 Rejimen Pertama Artileri Diraja (PARA) based in Malacca
 Rejimen Ke 2 Artileri Diraja based in Johor
 Rejimen Ke 3 Artileri Diraja based in Perak
 Rejimen Ke 4 Artileri Diraja based in Negeri Sembilan
 Rejimen Ke 5 Artileri Diraja based in Kelantan
 Rejimen ke 6 Artileri Diraja based in Sabah
 Rejimen ke 7 Artileri Diraja based in Pahang
 Rejimen ke 8 Artileri Diraja based in Sarawak
 Rejimen ke 21 Artileri Diraja based in Negeri Sembilan
 Rejimen ke 31 Artileri Diraja based in Kuala Lumpur
 Rejimen ke 32 Artileri Diraja based in Malacca
 Rejimen ke 33 Artileri Diraja based in Johor
 Rejimen ke 34 Artileri Diraja based in Negeri Sembilan
 361 Battery (361 Bti) Rejimen Artileri Diraja (Parachute) based in Malacca
 41 Bti Rejimen Artileri Diraja based in Selangor (carries out ceremonial duties)
 Rejimen ke 51 Artileri Diraja based in Negeri Sembilan
 Rejimen ke 52 Artileri Diraja based in Kedah
 Rejimen ke 61 Artileri Diraja based in Johor
 Pusat Latihan Artileri (Artillery Training Centre) based in Negeri Sembilan
 Rejimen ke 391 Artileri Diraja based in Negeri Sembilan

References

Artillery administrative corps
Malaysia Army corps and regiments
Military units and formations established in 1957